Danielle Tahuri (born 22 December 1988; as Danielle Barry) is a New Zealand badminton player who plays for the Te Atatu badminton club. In 2010, she competed at the Badminton at the 2010 Commonwealth Games. In 2015, she reach the mixed doubles final at the Oceania Championships and won silver. She also won the women's doubles bronze in 2010, 2015 and 2017; and the mixed doubles bronze in 2017.

Achievements

Oceania Championships 
Women's doubles

Mixed doubles

BWF International Challenge/Series 
Women's singles

Women's doubles

Mixed doubles

  BWF International Challenge tournament
  BWF International Series tournament
  BWF Future Series tournament

References

External links 
 

1988 births
Living people
Sportspeople from Auckland
New Zealand female badminton players
Badminton players at the 2010 Commonwealth Games
Commonwealth Games competitors for New Zealand